The Radnorshire Challenge Cup  is a football knockout tournament competed for by clubs either based within the Mid-Wales county boundary of Radnorshire or have a team in membership of the Mid Wales South League.

Previous winners

Information from the commencement of the competition until the 1990–91 season sourced from the 1991 Welsh Football Almanac.

1960s
 
1963–64: – Llandrindod Wells
1964–65: – Vale of Arrow (Gladestry)
1965–66: – Crossgates
1966–67: – Rhayader Town
1967–68: – Vale of Arrow (Gladestry)
1968–69: – Vale of Arrow (Gladestry)
1969–70: – Vale of Arrow (Gladestry)

1970s

1970–71: – Crossgates
1971–72: – Knighton Town
1972–73: – Knighton Town
1973–74: – Hay St Marys
1974–75: – Presteigne St. Andrews
1975–76: – Builth Wells
1976–77: – Rhayader Town
1977–78: – Aberystwyth Town reserves
1978–79: – Knighton Town
1979–80: – Knighton Town

1990s

1980–81: – Newtown reserves
1981–82: – Builth Wells
1982–83: – Builth Wells
1983–84: – Knighton Town
1984–85: – Presteigne St. Andrews
1985–86: – Newtown reserves
1986–87: – Builth Wells
1987–88: – Knighton Town
1988–89: – Talgarth Town
1989–90: – Builth Wells

1990s

1990–91: – Vale of Arrow (Gladestry)
1991–92: – Builth Wells
1992–93: – Kington Town
1993–94: – Vale of Arrow (Gladestry)
1994–95: – Knighton Town
1995–96: – Llanidloes Town
1996–97: – 
1997–98: – 
1998–99: – 
1999–2000: – Llandrindod Wells

2000s

2000–01: –  
2001–02: – Rhayader Town
2002–03: – Knighton Town
2003–04: – 
2004–05: – Presteigne St. Andrews
2005–06: – 
2006–07: – Hay St Marys
2007–08: – 
2008–09: – Rhayader Town
2009–10: – Presteigne St. Andrews

2010s

2010–11: – Llandrindod Wells
2011–12: – Llandrindod Wells
2012–13: – Rhayader Town
2013–14: – Rhayader Town
2014–15: – Rhayader Town
2015–16: – Hay St Marys
2016–17: – Llandrindod Wells
2017–18: – Radnor Valley
2018–19: – Llanidloes Town
2019–20: – Competition abandoned due to Coronavirus pandemic

2020s

2020–21: – No competition - Covid-19 pandemic
2021–22: – Hay St Marys

Number of wins by club
Note: missing seasons to be added.

Knighton Town – 8
Rhayader Town –7
Builth Wells – 6
Vale of Arrow (Gladestry) – 6
Llandrindod Wells – 5
Hay St Marys – 4
Presteigne St. Andrews – 4
Crossgates – 2
Llanidloes Town – 2
Newtown reserves
Aberystwyth Town reserves – 1 
Kington Town – 1
Radnor Valley – 1
Talgarth Town – 1

References

Football cup competitions in Wales
County Cup competitions
Football in Wales
1963 establishments in Wales
Recurring events established in 1963